Labeobarbus cardozoi is a species of cyprinid fish found in the Congo Democratic Republic and Angola in Africa.

References 

cardozoi
Cyprinid fish of Africa
Taxa named by George Albert Boulenger
Fish described in 1912